Hajji (sometimes spelled Hadji, Haji, Alhaji,  Al-Hadj, Al-Haj or El-Hajj) is an honorific title which is  given to a Muslim person who has successfully completed the Hajj to Mecca.

Stemming from the same origin, the term Hadži is used in Orthodox Christianity in the Balkan countries for people who go on pilgrimage to the grave of Christ in Jerusalem.

Etymology
Hajji is derived from the Arabic , which is the active participle of the verb  ("to make the pilgrimage"). The alternative form  is derived from the name of the Hajj with the adjectival suffix -ī, and this was the form adopted by non-Arabic languages.

Use
Hajji and its variant spellings are used as honorific titles for Muslims who have successfully completed the Hajj to Mecca.

It is often used to refer to an elder, since it can take years to accumulate the wealth to fund the travel (and did particularly before the advent of mass air travel), and in many Muslim societies to a respected man as an honorific title. The title is placed before a person's name; for example, Saif Gani becomes "Hajji Saif Gani".

These are abbreviated as Hj. and Hjh.

The term is also used in the Balkan Christian countries that were once under caliphate rule (Bulgaria, Serbia, Greece, Montenegro, North Macedonia and Romania) for a Christian who had traveled to Jerusalem and the Holy Lands.

In Cyprus the title is so prevalent that it has been permanently integrated into some Greek Christian family names, such as Hajiioannou. This happened because Cyprus is so close to the Holy Lands and Jerusalem, making Cyprus a place where Christians and Muslims have intermixed freely for many centuries.

In Iran the honorific title Haj is sometimes used for IRGC commanders, instead of the title Sardar ("General"), such as for Qasem Soleimani.

Other religions
The related term hadži is used in Orthodox Christianity in the Balkan countries for people who go on pilgrimage to the grave of Christ in Jerusalem. In some areas the title has become a family name, for example in the Bosniak surname Hadžiosmanović ("son of Hajji Osman").

The title has also been used in Jewish communities to honor those who made a pilgrimage to Jerusalem or other holy sites in Israel.

Racial slur
In the 21st century, American soldiers began using the term Haji as slang for Iraqis, Afghans, or Arab people in general. It is used in the way "gook" or "Charlie" was used by U.S military personnel during the Vietnam War.

See also 
Hatzi, a Greek surname prefix, stemming from the same origin
Islam
Pilgrimage

References

Islamic honorifics
Islam-related slurs
Anti–South Asian slurs
Titles of national or ethnic leadership